This is a list of Scottish football transfers featuring at least one 2017–18 Scottish Premiership club or one 2017–18 Scottish Championship club which were completed after the summer 2017 transfer window closed and before the end of the 2017–18 season.

List

See also
 List of Scottish football transfers summer 2017
 List of Scottish football transfers summer 2018

References

Transfers
Scottish
2017 in Scottish sport
2018 in Scottish sport
2017 winter